A windmill is an engine powered by the wind to produce energy.

Windmill may also refer to:

Music
 Windmills (Rick Roberts album)
 "Windmill" (song), a song by Helloween on the 1993 album Chameleon
 "Windmills", a song by The Vamps from the 2015 album Wake Up
 "Windmill" (Feeder song), a song by Feeder from the 2019 album Tallulah
 "Windmills", a song by Blackmore’s Night from the 2006 album The Village Lanterne
 "The Windmill", a march chant sung by English members of the French Foreign Legion
 Windmill, a guitar move credited to Pete Townshend of The Who

Films and television
 The Windmill (1937 film), a 1937 British film
 The Windmill (2016 film), a 2016 Dutch horror film
 Windmill (TV series), a 1980s BBC television series
 "Windmills", an episode of The Expanse

Sports and games 
 Windmill (chess), a combination of moves where a series of discovered checks result in winning of material
 Windmill (juggling), a juggling pattern
 Windmill (solitaire), a solitaire card game played with two decks of cards
 Windmill (sailing dinghy), class of racing sailboat

Places 
 Windmill, County Westmeath, Ireland
 Windmill, Derbyshire, England, United Kingdom
 Windmill, New Mexico, United States
 Windmill, a village near Pentre Halkyn, Wales, United Kingdom
 Windmill Islands, an Antarctic group of rocky islands and rocks
 The Windmill, Brixton, Brixton, England, United Kingdom

Other uses 
 Windmill (b-boy move), a breakdancing move
 Windmill (brand), a Japanese visual novel video game developer
 Windmill (card game)
 Windmill (G.I. Joe), a fictional character in the G.I. Joe universe
 "Windmill" (short story), a short story from the 1987 anthology The Dark Between the Stars
 Windmill restart, a maneuver that uses kinetic energy to restart a jet engine
 Windmill Software, Canadian software company
 Operation Windmill, a U.S. Navy exploration and training mission to Antarctica in 1947–48
 Original Heidelberg Platen Press, a letterpress printing press often referred to as the "Windmill"
 Windmill cookies, an alternate name for Speculaas-type cookies
 Windmills (plant), plants in the genus Allionia
 The Windmill (restaurant), a hotdog restaurant in New Jersey, US

See also
 Windmill Hill (disambiguation)
 Windmill Point (disambiguation)
 Windmill Theatre (disambiguation)
 List of windmills
 
 Water Mill (disambiguation)
 Wind (disambiguation)
 Mill (disambiguation)